Bryant Timothy Gavin (born Sydney 20 November 1963) is an Australian former state and national representative rugby union player who played Number 8 for the Wallabies in 47 Test matches in between 1988 and 1996.

Gavin played 83 times for New South Wales between 1988 and 1996 and captained them 30 times. He also played for Milan in Italy in the Australian off seasons between 1992 and 1995. He missed the 1991 Rugby World Cup victory as he suffered a knee injury just before the tournament but played in the 1995 tournament and the inaugural Tri-Nations Series

Later life
Since retiring from rugby, he has farmed land outside Gunnedah, New South Wales. and been President of the New South Wales Rugby Union.

Gavin was inducted into the Australian Rugby Hall of Fame in 2018.

References

Sources
 
 Fox Sports Interview
 :it:Tim Gavin - Wikipedia Italian

1963 births
Living people
Australian rugby union players
Australia international rugby union players
Rugby union number eights
Rugby union players from East Ayrshire